John Stafford (1893–1967) was a British film producer and director.

Selected filmography

Producer
 Where Is This Lady? (1932)
 No Funny Business (1933)
 There Goes Susie (1934)
 Spring in the Air (1934)
 Admirals All (1935)
 The Crouching Beast (1935)
 Ball at Savoy (1936)
 Beloved Imposter (1936)
 Wings Over Africa (1936)
 The Avenging Hand (1936)
 Second Bureau (1936)
 Wake Up Famous (1937)
 The Wife of General Ling (1937)
 Return of a Stranger (1937)
 Tomorrow We Live (1943)
 Candlelight in Algeria (1944)
 Teheran (1946)
 The Golden Madonna (1949)
 Call of the Blood (1949)
 The Woman with No Name (1950)
 The Planter's Wife (1952)
 The Stranger's Hand (1954))
 Loser Takes All (1956)
 Across the Bridge (1957)

Director
 The Inseparables (1929)
 Dick Turpin (1933)

Screenwriter
 The Beggar Student (1931)

References

External links
 

1893 births
1967 deaths
British film producers
Film directors from London